Larry or Lawrence Douglas may refer to:

 Larry Douglas (American football), American football player
 Larry Douglas (baseball) (1890–1949), Major League Baseball pitcher
Lawrence Douglas, lawyer

See also